Aloe andongensis is a species of flowering plant in the Asphodelaceae family. It found in Angola.

References

External links
 
 

andongensis
Taxa named by John Gilbert Baker